In mathematics, the limiting absorption principle (LAP) is a concept from operator theory and scattering theory that consists of choosing the "correct" resolvent of a linear operator at the essential spectrum based on the behavior of the resolvent near the essential spectrum. The term is often used to indicate that the resolvent, when considered not in the original space (which is usually the  space), but in certain weighted spaces (usually , see below), has a limit as the spectral parameter approaches the essential spectrum.
This concept developed from the idea of introducing complex parameter into the Helmholtz equation  for selecting a particular solution. This idea is credited to Vladimir Ignatowski, who was considering the propagation and absorption of the electromagnetic waves in a wire.
It is closely related to the Sommerfeld radiation condition and the limiting amplitude principle (1948).
The terminology – both the limiting absorption principle and the limiting amplitude principle – was introduced by Aleksei Sveshnikov.

Formulation
To find which solution to the Helmholz equation with nonzero right-hand side

with some fixed , corresponds to the outgoing waves,
one considers the limit

The relation to absorption can be traced to the expression

having negative imaginary part (and thus with  no longer belonging to the spectrum of ).
Above,  is magnetic permeability,  is electric conductivity,  is dielectric constant,

Example and relation to the limiting amplitude principle

Let us describe its resolvent, . Given the equation
,
then, for the spectral parameter  from the resolvent set , the solution  is given by

where the fundamental solution is given by

 
.
Depending on whether  approaches  in the complex plane from above or from below of the real axis, there will be two different limiting expressions:

when  approaches  from above and

when  approaches  from below.
The resolvent  (convolution with ) corresponds to outgoing waves of the inhomogeneous Helmholtz equation , while   corresponds to incoming waves.
This is directly related to the limiting amplitude principle:
to find which solution corresponds to the outgoing waves,
one considers the inhomogeneous wave equation

with zero initial data .

Estimates in the weighted spaces
Let  be a linear operator in a Banach space , defined on the domain .
More precisely, there is the relation

Many scientists refer to the "limiting absorption principle" when they want to say that the resolvent  of a particular operator , when considered as acting in certain weighted spaces, has a limit (and/or remains uniformly bounded) as the spectral parameter  approaches the essential spectrum, . 

with fixed . The spaces  are defined as spaces of locally integrable functions such that their -norm,

is finite.

See also

 Sommerfeld radiation condition
 Limiting amplitude principle

References

Linear operators
Operator theory
Scattering theory
Spectral theory